The 2015–16 NCAA Division III men's ice hockey season began on October 30, 2015, and concluded on March 26, 2016. This was the 43rd season of Division III college ice hockey.

ECAC East rebranded itself as the New England Hockey Conference (NEHC) and retained the same league membership from the previous year.

Regular season

Season tournaments

Standings

Note: Mini-game are not included in final standings

2016 NCAA Tournament

Note: * denotes overtime period(s)

See also
 2015–16 NCAA Division I men's ice hockey season
 2015–16 NCAA Division II men's ice hockey season

References

External links

 
NCAA